Incest Brothers was a Swedish punk rock band formed in September 1978 in Järfälla.

The Band 
The original Incest Brothers was formed an evening in August 1977, but was the band was reformed in September 1978 with many new members.

Together with KSMB and Travolta Kids the band participated on the Bakverk 80 album. Mongo now plays the bass and sings in Köttgrottorna. Johnny Essing plays guitar in bob hund and Bergman Rock.

Members 
Stefan "Mongo" Enger (bass and vocals)
Happy Törnblom (drums and vocals)
Johnny Essing (guitar)
Sir N Andersson (guitar and vocals)
Hazze Johannesson (vocals)
Tomas Svensson (bass)
Vortex (guitar)
Sören Carlsson (drums)
Pettersson (organ)

Discography
1979 - Bakverk 80
1984 - Tre år försent
1986 - Ståkkålmsjävlar 1978-1981 (compilation)
1993 - Ny våg 78-82 (compilation)
1996 - Break the Rules, Volume 7 (compilation)
2002 - Stockholmspunk 79-91 (compilation)
2003 - Svenska punkklassiker 78-81 (compilation)

References

External links
Live pictures at notfound.se
 MusicBrainz
 Punktipset

Swedish punk rock groups